Mike Botuli Cestor (born 30 April 1992) is a Congolese professional footballer who plays as a centre-back for Polish club Radomiak Radom.

Born in France, Cestor has earned caps for DR Congo at under-20 level.

Club career

Early career
Cestor was born in Bagneux, Hauts-de-Seine, Paris. Before trialling for Leyton Orient, Cestor had been on the books as a youth player for Italian side Pisa.

Leyton Orient
Cestor joined Orient's youth squad early in the 2009–10 season and also featured in the reserve team before being called up to the first-team squad in December 2009, although he made no first-team appearances. He signed a new two-year contract on 9 June 2010, and he made his professional debut in a League Cup match for Orient, as they won 2–1 at Swindon Town on 10 August 2010. His league debut came three days later in the 3–1 defeat to Charlton Athletic.

On 11 January 2011, Cestor went on a month's loan to Boreham Wood, making his debut on 15 January in the 2–0 win over Chelmsford City.

Woking
On 19 August 2011, he went on a month's loan to Woking, and made his debut the following day in the 0–0 draw at home to his old club Boreham Wood. He made seven appearances for Woking before returning to Orient and coming on as a substitute in their 3–2 League Cup defeat at Blackburn Rovers on 20 September. He returned to Woking on 12 January 2012 for another month's loan spell, which was later extended, and after a brief return to Orient, he began yet another loan period at Woking. On 15 May 2012, he was one of three players released by Orient manager Russell Slade. On 19 July 2012, Cestor signed permanently for Woking, who were newly promoted to the Football Conference.

On 20 December 2014, in a 2–1 defeat to Southport, Cestor suffered a long term knee injury, therefore ruling him out for the remainder of the 2014–15 campaign.

Ahead of the following campaign, Cestor was released at the end of his contract, due to his slow progress with his injury.

Épinal
On 2 July 2016, Cestor joined French side SAS Épinal after a year without a club.

International career
Prior to the 2013 Toulon Tournament, Cestor received a call-up for the DR Congo U20 team. Cestor went on to start all four of DR Congo's games in the Toulon campaign, initially making his debut in a 1–0 defeat against the France U20 side on 30 May 2013.

Career statistics

Club

Honours
CFR Cluj
Liga I: 2019–20, 2020–21, 2021–22

References

External links

1992 births
Living people
Footballers from Hauts-de-Seine
Black French sportspeople
People from Bagneux, Hauts-de-Seine
French sportspeople of Democratic Republic of the Congo descent
Citizens of the Democratic Republic of the Congo through descent
French footballers
Democratic Republic of the Congo footballers
Democratic Republic of the Congo under-20 international footballers
Association football defenders
English Football League players
National League (English football) players
Championnat National players
Championnat National 2 players
Liga I players
Ekstraklasa players
Pisa S.C. players
Leyton Orient F.C. players
Boreham Wood F.C. players
Woking F.C. players
SAS Épinal players
FC Astra Giurgiu players
CFR Cluj players
FC Argeș Pitești players
Radomiak Radom players
Democratic Republic of the Congo expatriate footballers
Democratic Republic of the Congo expatriate sportspeople in England
Expatriate footballers in England
Democratic Republic of the Congo expatriate sportspeople in Romania
Expatriate footballers in Romania
Democratic Republic of the Congo expatriate sportspeople in Poland
Expatriate footballers in Poland